The Army of the Elbe was a Prussian formation during the Austro-Prussian War. Being a wartime organization of the Prussian Army; it afterwards was demobilized.

Creation 
Helmuth von Moltke the Elder created the Army of the Elbe for the Austro-Prussian War. It was one of three main field armies of the Prussian Army established during that war. The Army of the Elbe consisted of three division, two cavalry brigades and 144 guns. When it was created the unit were in cantonments around Torgau. Commanded by General Karl Eberhard Herwarth von Bittenfeld; the Army of the Elbe used to be the VIII Corps, reinforced by the 14th Division.  Chief of Staff was Oberst Ludwig von Schlotheim.

Order of Battle 
The Army of the Elbe had the following order of battle:

Commanding General: General Karl Eberhard Herwarth von Bittenfeld

Chief of Staff: Oberst Ludwig von Schlotheim

Chief of Artillery: Oberst Hermann von Rozynski-Manger

14th Division 

 14. Division, Hugo Eberhard zu Münster-Meinhövel
 Brigade „Schwarzkoppen“ (27. Infanterie-Brigade), Emil von Schwartzkoppen
 3. Westfälisches Infanterie-Regiment Nr. 16, Oberst von Schwartz
 7. Westfälisches Infanterie-Regiment Nr. 56, Oberst Adolf von Dorpowski
 Brigade „Hiller“ (28. Infanterie-Brigade), Wilhelm August Bernhard von Hiller
 4. Westfälisches Infanterie-Regiment Nr. 17, Oberst von Kottwitz
 8. Westfälisches Infanterie-Regiment Nr. 57, Oberst Albert von der Osten
 Westfälisches Dragoner-Regiment Nr. 7, Oberst von Ribbeck

VII Corps 

 15. Division, Philipp Carl von Canstein
 Brigade „Stückradt“ (29. Infanterie-Brigade), Generalmajor Alexander von Stuckrad
 Niederrheinisches Füsilier-Regiment Nr. 39, Oberstleutnant von Zimmermann
 5. Rheinisches Infanterie-Regiment Nr. 65, Oberst du Trossel
 Brigade „Glasenapp“ (30. Infanterie-Brigade), Otto von Glasenapp
 2. Rheinisches Infanterie-Regiment Nr. 28, Oberst von Gerstein-Hohenstein
 6. Rheinisches Infanterie-Regiment Nr. 68, Oberst Wilhelm von Gayl
 Königs-Husaren-Regiment (1. Rheinisches) Nr. 7, Oberst von Lindern

 16. Division, August von Etzel
 Brigade „Schöler“ (31. Infanterie-Brigade), Generalmajor Alexander von Schoeler
 3. Rheinisches Infanterie-Regiment Nr. 29, Oberst Ernst Wilhelm Schuler von Senden
 7. Rheinisches Infanterie-Regiment Nr. 69, Oberst von Beyer
 Füsilier-Brigade
 Ostpreußisches Füsilier-Regiment Nr. 33, Oberst August Ferdinand von Wegerer
 Pommersches Füsilier-Regiment Nr. 34, Oberst Wilhelm von Schmeling

Cavalry 

 8th (Rhenish) Cuirassiers "Count Geßler"
 Westfälisches Ulanen-Regiment Nr. 5
 Ulanen-Regiment „Großherzog Friedrich von Baden“ (Rheinisches) Nr. 7
 11th Hussar Regiment

Course of War 
The Army of the Elbe was one of the three columns attacking Austria. The Army of the Elbe was very close to the First Army, commanded by Prince Friedrich Karl of Prussia; who commanded all attacks. The two field armies lacked supplies but still were victorious in its battles. On the 16th of June, they started the invasion of the Kingdom of Saxony after the Saxon Army had retreated to Bohemia. The Battle of Königgrätz was started by Elbe Army's offensive to Dresden. They were the first to get attacked during the battle. However General von Bittenfeld did not order a main attack against the Austrians.

See also 
 Königgrätz order of battle
 First Army
 Second Army

References

Literature 
 
 

Units and formations of the Prussian Army
Austro-Prussian War
Field armies of Germany